Kenneth S. Abraham (born 1946) is the Harrison Distinguished Professor of Law at the University of Virginia School of Law.

Biography

In 1967, Abraham graduated with a bachelor's degree from Indiana University, magna cum laude, where he was elected to Phi Beta Kappa. Abraham then attended Yale Law School, where he studied under famed torts scholar and future judge of the United States Court of Appeals for the Second Circuit Guido Calabresi, graduating with a J.D. in 1971.

After law school, Abraham worked in private practice in Hackensack, New Jersey, before teaching law at Case Western Reserve University School of Law and then at University of Maryland School of Law. He began teaching full-time at UVA Law in 1984. Abraham specializes in the law of torts and insurance, including emerging fields of torts and insurance such as the liability of self-driving cars.

Abraham is a life member of the American Law Institute, where he has served as an adviser on the Restatement of the Law of Liability Insurance and several iterations of the Restatement (Third) of Torts.

Selected publications

References

External links

Profile at University of Virginia School of Law

1946 births
Living people
American jurists
Yale Law School alumni
University of Virginia School of Law faculty
Scholars of tort law
American legal writers
21st-century American lawyers